Iliad Italia S.p.A. is an Italian telephone company, part of the Iliad group.

In December 2022, with 9.56 million active lines, it is the fourth mobile operator in Italy following Wind Tre, TIM and Vodafone Italy.

History 
Iliad Italia S.p.A. was founded in 2016 as an Italian subsidiary of the French group Iliad S.A. In 2017, in view of the launch and in compliance with the provisions of the European Commission, the acquisition of the frequencies ceased by Wind Tre began following the merger of Wind and 3 Italy; as of 31 December 2017, Iliad has acquired almost 300 of the sites abandoned by Wind Tre, while the remaining will be transferred, according to the agreements, by the end of 2019.

The French holding said it would invest more than €1 billion for the launch and development of the new Italian mobile operator (including those to win the new 5G frequencies in Italy) and also expected about a thousand hires.

On 16 January 2018 the name of the Italian administrator of Iliad Italia, Benedetto Levi, was officially announced, together with the presentation of the new logo and the institutional website. As part of the implementation of the infrastructures required to cover the Italian territory with its own network, on 16 February 2018, an agreement was reached with the Spanish group Cellnex, which provides Iliad Italia with over 7700 cellular antennas in Italy. Finally, on 29 May 2018, the official launch of the operator took place, in conjunction with the presentation of the commercial offer and the start of the sale of SIM cards with new numbers or to carry out the number portability from other phone operators. On 18 July 2018, just under two months after its launch, Iliad Italia officially announced that it had reached one million customers between requests for portability and new subscriptions. On 4 September 2018, the Iliad group releases the results of the first half of 2018, reporting the achievement – by early August – of one and a half million customers in Italy. On 6 September 2018, Iliad Italia issued a press release confirming the achievement of two million customers.

During the first semester of 2021, Iliad reached the break-even point and an EBITDA of 6 million euro, the first positive result since its foundation. As of September 2021, its Italian mobile network counted about 8.200 active site nodes.

Simbox distributions 
Iliad introduced the Simboxes in Italy, a new type of sales point, conceived and created by the French group, Aures and already in use since 2014 on the French market by Free Mobile; these are SIM card vending machines, which allow customers to register and purchase it independently.

Network 
Iliad's 3G, 4G and 5G network is being implemented; however, the operator benefits from national coverage through an agreement with Wind Tre in RAN sharing (3G and 4G) and roaming (2G).

Iliad signed an agreement, respectively, with Cellnex (February 2018) and INWIT (February 2019) in order to install its antennas on their towers.

Iliad Italia is currently using, among others, CommScope telecommunications equipment and is collaborating with Cisco Systems (April 2019) and Nokia (September 2019)  to implement a state-of-the-art national network (IPv6) in Italy based on segment routing (SRv6) and to achieve its 5G network.

References

External links
 

Companies based in Milan
Mobile phone companies of Italy
Telecommunications companies established in 2016
Iliad